Russell Trueblood Hoopingarner (October 5, 1894 – August 1964) was an American politician in the state of Washington. He served in the Washington House of Representatives from 1949 to 1953.

References

1965 deaths
1894 births
Democratic Party members of the Washington House of Representatives
People from Daviess County, Indiana
20th-century American politicians